Kennewick High School is a public high school located in eastern Kennewick, Washington. It was founded in 1904 to serve the educational needs of the new city of Kennewick. It is one of only a few schools to have its music department honored with the title of "Grammy Signature School". The school is part of the Kennewick School District.

The current building, constructed in 1954 and originally named Edwin S. Black Senior High School, is located at 500 S. Dayton St., and incorporates the remainder of the second high school building, which until 1966 served as Park Junior High School (now known as Park Middle School) as an annex.  Both buildings were renovated in the mid-1990s, the annex first, then the main building. The first building has long since been demolished, the location became until 1994 the location of Kennewick School District 17's administration.

For 64 years until the founding of Kamiakin High School, Kennewick High School served as the sole high school in the city. Its colors are orange and black, and its mascot is a lion. Football and soccer games are played at Neil F. Lampson Stadium, which is located on the high school's grounds and is shared by both Kamiakin and Southridge High School.

Athletics

Recently, because of a change in enrollment accounting by the Washington Interscholastic Activities Association, Kennewick High, along with Southridge, was reclassified as a 3A school.  As a result, the Columbia Basin Big 9 Conference (which consisted of 11 schools), was reconfigured into the Mid Columbia Conference. The new conference now consists of 8 schools; four 3A and four 4A.  Kennewick High is in the 3A division, along with Southridge and Hanford High School. The 4A division consists of  Kamiakin, Richland High School, Pasco High School, Walla Walla High School, and Chiawana High School. Kennewick High School has a traditional rivalry with Kamiakin High School, however in recent years both schools have become bigger rivals with Southridge High School than with each other.

Fight song

The school's fight song, "Onward Kennewick", is based upon the University of Wisconsin–Madison's fight song,  (as well as the Wisconsin state song) "On, Wisconsin!", with the words 'Onward Kennewick' replacing 'On, Wisconsin', as well as minor changes in the lyrics, depending on whatever sport season it was.  Otherwise, the song's lyrics are the same.

Onward Kennewick, onward Kennewick
Lions, fight for fame
Pass the ball right down the field (court) boys
Touchdown (Basket) ev'ry time!
Onward Kennewick, onward Kennewick
Lions, fight for fame
Fight, Lions, fight-fight-fight
To win this game!

K! E! N! NEW! I! C! K!
(rah-rah-rah)

(next two stanzas unspoken)

Fight, lions, fight-fight-fight
To win this game!!!

Notable alumni
Adam Carriker, NFL player for the Washington Redskins, former player for the Nebraska Cornhuskers
Michael Farris, founder and Chancellor of Patrick Henry College, founder and chairman of the Homeschool Legal Defense Association, constitutional lawyer
Ray Mansfield, 2x Super Bowl winner for the Pittsburgh Steelers, former Hall of Fame player for the Washington Huskies
Leilani Mitchell, WNBA player on the Washington Mystics
Russ Swan, Former MLB player (San Francisco Giants, Seattle Mariners, Cleveland Indians)

Hall of Fame
In 2010, Kennewick High School started their Hall of Fame. The Hall of Fame committee of Kennewick High School selects inductees from a pool of nominations submitted by the community. Requirements included having excelled in the arts, science, athletics, the military or in community service after graduation.

Michael Farris, United States constitutional lawyer, founder of the Home School Legal Defense Association (HSLDA) and Patrick Henry College, Class of '69
Blanche Dickinson Pratt, co-founder of the East Benton County Historical Society, Class of '21
John Dexter Smith, inventor, Class of '43
Ray Mansfield, 2x Super Bowl winner for the Pittsburgh Steelers, Class of '59, Hall of Fame player for the Washington Huskies
Jim Jesernig, politician, Class of '75

References

External links
Kennewick High School
Kennewick High School football
Kennewick High School Hall of Fame Nominations

High schools in Benton County, Washington
Schools in Kennewick, Washington
Educational institutions established in 1904
Public high schools in Washington (state)
1904 establishments in Washington (state)